NHMC may stand for:

 National Hispanic Media Coalition, a media advocacy and civil rights organization for the advancement of Latinos
 Natural History Museum of Crete, a natural history museum that operates under the auspices of the University of Crete
 Nehru Homeopathic Medical College, a homeopathic medical college located in New Delhi